Kalyani is a small village is located in Bansihari subdivision of Dakshin Dinajpur district in West Bengal, India.

Location 
Balurghat is the district headquarter of this village. The code of this village is 311678.

Population 
With 259 houses the total population of the village is 1,183 peoples, out of which male population is 588 while female population is 595.

See also 

 Kushkari, town near Kalyani.
 Dahuakuri village in Dakshin Dinajpur.

References

Villages in Dakshin Dinajpur district